Merash (also Romanized as Merāsh and Marāsh) is a village in Anguran Rural District, Anguran District, Mahneshan County, Zanjan Province, Iran. At the 2006 census, its population was 234, in 57 families.

References 

Populated places in Mahneshan County